John Charles Lucas (February 10, 1903 – October 31, 1970) nicknamed "Buster", was a backup outfielder who played briefly for the Boston Red Sox in the 1931-32 seasons. He was born in Glen Carbon, Illinois.

Over four games, Lucas went hitless in three at bats. He had no fielding chances in two outfield appearances.

Lucas died in Maryville, Illinois at age 67.

External links

Retrosheet

Boston Red Sox players
Major League Baseball outfielders
Baseball players from Illinois
1903 births
1970 deaths
People from Glen Carbon, Illinois